Samuel Eldred Greenlee, Jr. (July 13, 1930 – May 19, 2014) was an American writer of fiction and poetry. He is best known for his novel The Spook Who Sat by the Door, first published in March 1969 in London by Allison & Busby (with Ghanaian-born Margaret Busby as its editor), having been rejected by dozens of mainstream publishers, and received much critical attention, including extracts being printed in The Observer newspaper. The novel was subsequently made into the 1973 movie of the same name, directed by Ivan Dixon and co-produced and written by Greenlee, that is now considered a "cult classic".

Life and work

Early years and education
Sam Greenlee was born in St. Luke's Hospital, Chicago, Illinois, to an African-American family. His parents were singer and dancer Desoree Alexander and railroad man and union activist Samuel Greenlee. He grew up in west Woodlawn. He attended Englewood High School, and in 1948 won a track scholarship to the University of Wisconsin, graduating in 1952 with a BS degree in political science. He was a member of Kappa Alpha Psi fraternity (Beta Omicron 1950). He served in the United States Army from 1952 to 1954, earning the rank of first lieutenant, and from 1954 to 1957 did graduate studies in international relations at the University of Chicago.

U.S. foreign service
In 1957 Greenlee began a career with the United States Information Agency (USIA), and, as one of the first black officials to work overseas, served in Iraq, Pakistan, Indonesia, and Greece between 1957 and 1965. In 1958 he was awarded the Meritorious Service Medal for bravery during the 14 July Revolution in Baghdad.

Leaving the USIA after eight years, he stayed on in Greece where he undertook further study (1963–64) at the University of Thessaloniki, and lived for three years on the island of Mykonos.

Writing career
It was while living on Mykonos that Greenlee began to write his first and best known novel, entitled The Spook Who Sat by the Door, which was the story of a black man who is recruited as a CIA officer and having mastered the skills of a spy then uses them to lead a black guerrilla movement in the United States. Rejected by many mainstream publishers on both sides of the Atlantic, the novel was eventually published in London in March 1969 by Allison and Busby, Greenlee having been introduced to Ghanaian-born publisher Margaret Busby by a mutual friend in Mykonos. The book achieved significant critical attention and was subsequently published in the US  by Richard W. Baron.

Greenlee later co-wrote (with Mel Clay) the screenplay for what became the 1973 film The Spook Who Sat by the Door that he co-produced with director Ivan Dixon, and which is considered "one of the more memorable and impassioned films that came out around the beginning of the notoriously polarizing blaxploitation era." In 2011, an independent documentary entitled Infiltrating Hollywood: The Rise and Fall of the Spook Who Sat by the Door was filmed by Christine Acham and Clifford Ward, about the making and reception of the Spook film, in which Greenlee spoke out about the suppression of the film soon after its release. In a chance meeting with Aubrey Lewis (1935–2001), one of the first Black FBI agents to have been recruited in 1962 by the FBI, Greenlee was told that The Spook Who Sat by the Door was required reading at the FBI Academy in Quantico, Virginia.

Other works by Greenlee include Baghdad Blues, a 1976 novel based on his experiences traveling in Iraq in the 1950s and witnessing the 1958 Iraqi revolution, Blues for an African Princess (a 1971 collection of poems), and Ammunition (poetry, 1975).  He also wrote short stories, plays (although he found no producer for any of them), and the screenplay for a film short called Lisa Trotter (2010), a story adapted from Aristophanes' Lysistrata.

Later years

Greenlee lived in Ghana and Spain for some years, before returning to Chicago in the late 1980s. In 1990 he was named the Poet Laureate of Chicago. He taught screenwriting at Columbia College Chicago and hosted a talk show on WVON radio. He also worked on an autobiography that was to be called Sam's Blues: Adventures of a Travelling Man.

In 2018, Greenlee was inducted into the Chicago Literary Hall of Fame.

Death
On May 19, 2014, Greenlee died in Chicago at the age of 83. On June 6, 2014, Chicago's DuSable Museum of African American History sponsored an evening of celebration in his honor, attended by his daughter Natiki Montano.

Bibliography 
Novels
The Spook Who Sat by the Door, London: Allison & Busby, 1969.
Baghdad Blues, New York: Bantam Books, 1976.

Poetry
Blues for an African Princess, Chicago: Third World Press, 1971.
Ammunition!: Poetry and Other Raps (introduction by Andrew Salkey), London: Bogle-L'Ouverture, 1975.
Be-Bop Man/Be-Bop Woman, 1968–1993: Poetry and Other Raps, Cambrea Heights, NY: Natiki, 1995.

Short stories
 "Yes, We Can Sing", Negro Digest, 15.2 (December 1965), pp. 65–69.
 "The Sign", Negro Digest, 15.4 (February 1966), pp. 61–66.
 "Summer Sunday", Negro Digest, 15.11 (September 1966), 60–61.
 "Autumn Leaves", in Negro Digest 16.3 (January 1967), pp. 69–73.
 "The D.C. Blues", Negro Digest, 18.8 (June 1969), 86–92.
 "Sonny's Seasons", Black World, 19.12 (October 1970), pp. 58–63.
 "Sonny's Not Blue", in Woodie King (ed.), Black Short Story Anthology, New York: Signet, 1972, p. 91–96.
 "Blues for Little Prez", in Black World, 22.10 (August 1973), pp. 54–62. Reprinted in Sascha Feinstein and David Rife (eds), The Jazz Fiction Anthology, Indiana University Press, 2009, pp. 205–13.

References

External links 
 SGJ Legacy – Sam Greenlee website.
 
 Biography of Greenlee from Emmanuel Sampath Nelson (ed.), Contemporary African-American Novelists: A Bio-Bibliographical Critical Sourcebook, Greenwood Press, 1999, pp. 185–91.
 Sam Greenlee page, Artmakers, The History Makers.
 Tambay A. Obenson, "Sam Greenlee Has A Few Things To Say About What We Call 'Black Cinema'...", IndieWire, February 24, 2013.
 , December 22, 2012.
 Jamilah King, "Sam Greenlee, Author of 'The Spook Who Sat By the Door,' Has Died" (with video interview), Colorlines, May 19, 2014.
 Cherryl Aldave, "Sam Greenlee's debut novel, The Spook Who Sat by the Door, drew up the blueprint for Black nationalization" (interview), Wax Poetics, May 20, 2014 (originally published as "The Revolution" in 2011).
 Gregg Reese, "Radical novelist Sam Greenlee dies at 83", Our Weekly (Los Angeles), May 22, 2014. Retrieved May 30, 2014.
 Charles D. Ellison, "We're Still Living With the Specter of Sam Greenlee's Spook Who Sat by the Door", The Root, May 22, 2014.
 Richard R. Guzman, "Sam Greenlee: Spooks Sitting by Doors", February 20, 2015.
 Melvin T. Peters, "Sam Greenlee and the Revolutionary Tradition in African American Literature in the 19th–21st Centuries" . Delivered at the Charles H. Wright Museum of African American History Liberation Film Series, March 14, 2015.

1930 births
2014 deaths
20th-century African-American writers
20th-century American dramatists and playwrights
20th-century American male writers
20th-century American novelists
20th-century American poets
21st-century African-American people
African-American dramatists and playwrights
African-American male writers
African-American novelists
African-American poets
African-American screenwriters
African-American short story writers
American male dramatists and playwrights
American male novelists
American male poets
American male screenwriters
Englewood Technical Prep Academy alumni
Novelists from Illinois
Poets laureate
Screenwriters from Illinois
University of Chicago alumni
University of Wisconsin–Madison College of Letters and Science alumni
Writers from Chicago
Poets from Illinois